The title Vietnamese Heroic Mother is a Vietnamese title of honor awarded, or posthumously awarded, to mothers who have made numerous contributions and sacrifices for the cause of national liberation, national construction and defense, and the performance of international obligations.

It is awarded in compliance with the regulations of the Standing Committee of the National Assembly of the Socialist Republic of Vietnam.

Criteria 
A mother who fits one or more of the following criteria are eligible to be awarded or posthumously awarded the title of Vietnamese Heroic Mother

 Have two or more children who are martyrs (soldiers who died fighting for the country)
 Have two children of which one is a martyr while the other is a wounded veteran who lost 81% of their working ability
 Have an only child who is a martyr
 Have a child who is a martyr and a husband or the mother themselves are martyr
 Have a child who is a martyr and the mothers themselves are wounded veterans who lost 81% of their working ability

Both biological and adopted children are counted as long as the mothers are the legal guardian.

Benefits 
Those awarded the titles are also awarded Certificate, Badge and a government-paid award ceremony (or funeral if posthumously awarded) as well as government subsidies.

See also
 Vietnam awards and decorations

References

Vietnamese awards
Awards established in 1970
Orders, decorations, and medals of Vietnam
Hero (title)